Ocado Group is a British business based in Hatfield, England, which licenses grocery technology. It also owns a 50% share in the UK retail business, Ocado.com (the other 50% is owned by UK retailer Marks & Spencer). The company is listed on the London Stock Exchange and is a constituent of the FTSE 100 Index.

History

Ocado was founded in April 2000 by Jonathan Faiman, Jason Gissing and Tim Steiner, former merchant bankers with Goldman Sachs. Ocado was launched in January 2000 as a concept and started trading as a business in partnership with Waitrose, part of the John Lewis Partnership, in January 2002.

In September 2006, Michael Grade became non-executive chairman of Ocado. In November 2008, the John Lewis Partnership transferred its shareholding of 29% into its staff pension fund. In May 2010 the John Lewis Partnership entered into a 10-year branding and supply agreement with Ocado. In February 2011, the John Lewis pension fund sold off its entire Ocado shareholding.

On 13 July 2009, Ocado released its first app for the iPhone. The app, called 'Ocado on the Go', allows users to do their grocery shopping without the need for a PC. On 19 April 2010, the company extended the app to Android devices.

In July 2010, Ocado undertook a stock market Initial public offering.

In January 2014, Ocado started providing website, warehousing and delivery services for one of their main grocery rivals, Morrisons supermarkets, allowing them to operate online using Ocado's network of depots to deliver Morrisons groceries to online customers.

In 2015 Ocado launched the Ocado Smart Platform, its proprietary end-to-end solution for operating retail businesses online. The company went on to sell the platform to the French Casino Group in November 2017, to the Canadian supermarket chain Sobeys in January 2018, to the US retail company Kroger in May 2018, and to the Australian retail business Coles Group in May 2020.

In the early morning of 5 February 2019, Ocado's customer fulfilment centre (CFC) in Andover, Hampshire, which handles 10 per cent of its fulfilments, caught fire. The fire continued to burn the following day, engaging more than 25 fire engines and 300 firefighters from multiple fire services, as far as Kent. The fire burned for more than 3 days, with the roof collapsing in the process. The fire was found to have started due a fault in a battery charging unit, and was exacerbated by worker responses. The warehouse was rebuilt, and was operational by August 2021.

On 27 February 2019, Ocado and Marks & Spencer announced a Joint Venture, whereby Marks & Spencer acquired a 50% share in Ocado's UK retail business, Ocado.com. Ocado ceased selling own brand groceries from the Waitrose supermarket chain in September 2020.

Activities 

The company licenses Ocado Smart Platform, a proprietary solution for operating retail businesses online. It also owns a 50% share in the UK retail business, Ocado.com (the other 50% is owned by UK retailer Marks & Spencer).

Name
Jez Frampton, CEO of Interbrand and non-executive director of Ocado, claims the name "Ocado" is "a made-up word, intended to evoke fresh fruit". Neil Taylor, an Interbrand consultant, stated that the name was derived from avocado.

See also
 Webvan
 List of online grocers

References

External links

 

2002 establishments in the United Kingdom
John Lewis Partnership
Online grocers
Online retailers of the United Kingdom
Retail companies established in 2002
Companies based in Welwyn Hatfield
Companies listed on the London Stock Exchange
2010 initial public offerings